The Oak Creek Ranch School was a co-ed ranch school in Cornville in the U.S. state of Arizona. It focused on students with attention deficit disorder (ADD) and attention deficit hyperactivity disorder (ADHD). It was founded in 1972 by David Wick, Sr., father of the current headmaster of the school.

References

External links

 Oak Creek Ranch School

Ranch schools
Private high schools in Arizona
Schools in Yavapai County, Arizona
Boarding schools in Arizona
Private middle schools in Arizona
Therapeutic boarding schools in the United States